Seniors Solidarity was a minor political party in Ireland. It was founded in November 2008, by John Wolfe following the Medical Card changes in the 2009 Budget.

It announced it would stand candidates at the 2009 local elections, all candidates being over the age of 60. John Wolfe stood in the Howth-Malahide local electoral area in Fingal County Council. He received 1,319 votes (5.9%) but was not elected. The party had hoped to run candidates at the 2011 general election, but did not register to take part in national elections.

It was registered to contest local elections in Dublin including County Dublin. It has not contested any elections since 2009.

As of 2015, it is no longer a registered political party.

References

2008 establishments in Ireland
2015 disestablishments in Ireland
Defunct political parties in the Republic of Ireland
Pensioners' parties
Political parties disestablished in 2015
Political parties established in 2008